Union County is a county located in the U.S. state of South Carolina. As of the 2020 census, the population was 27,244. Its county seat is Union. The county was created in 1785.

Union County is coterminous with the Union, SC, Micropolitan Statistical Area, which is also included in the Greenville–Spartanburg–Anderson, SC Combined Statistical Area.

History

Early settlement 
The area that includes Union County was once controlled by the Cherokee Indians and they used it as a hunting ground. Up until recent years, one could find numerous arrowheads with little effort throughout the county.

The first European settlers in Union County came from the backcountry of Virginia and Pennsylvania; more than three-fourths were Scots-Irish Presbyterians. It has been suggested that the first group of pioneers arrived as early as 1751. They settled in the northwestern section of the county near a small river that would later be named Fairforest Creek. According to tradition, Mr. McElwaine, a member of the party looked out at the thick woodlands and exclaimed, "What a fair forest!" At the time of their arrival, wild buffalo and horses abounded as well as panthers and cougars, which were called "tigers" or "tygers" by the settlers. This may be where the Tyger River got its name.

The early settlers established Fairforest Presbyterian Church, the first house of worship in Union County. Around 1754, the Brown's Creek area was first settled, about four miles northeast of the present city of Union. A log church or meetinghouse was built and shared among several denominations that could not yet afford their own separate structures. The county and county seat were named for this "Union" church. Quakers arrived in the mid 1750s and settled the southern portion of the county, establishing Cane Creek Church in the Santuc community, and Padgett's Creek Church in the Cross Keys community. The Quakers left in the early 1800s because of their opposition to slavery. Baptists from North Carolina, under the leadership of Rev. Philip Mulkey, reached the Broad River in Fairfield County, SC in 1759. They relocated to Union County in 1762 and in 1771 formally organized into the first Baptist church in the South Carolina upcountry known as Fairforest Baptist Church. Many Baptist churches throughout the upcountry are descended from this original congregation. The congregation later moved to a site on present day SC Hwy 18 between Union and Jonesville where it remains to this day.

Revolutionary period 

During the first part of the American Revolution, the South Carolina backcountry was fairly quiet. Following the fall of Charleston in 1780, the British began focusing their attention on the Carolinas. At least five battles were fought in or near Union County, including Musgrove Mill, Fishdam and Blackstock. The county also produced many notable heroes including Lt. Col. James Steen. The war divided the population between Loyalists and Patriots. This resulted in churches splitting up and settlers moving out of the area. Personal property was damaged by both sides.

Following the war, the county seat was established at Unionville (now Union) and a courthouse was constructed. In 1791, the South Carolina Legislature established a district court that included Spartanburg, Union, Chester, and York counties. The area was called the Pinckney District and its headquarters was established at a central location in Union County. Land was cleared and streets were laid out for a new town that would be called Pinckneyville. A courthouse and jail were built for the new judicial district and a college was to be established in the town.

Local tradition states that Pinckneyville was to be home to the United States Military Academy, but lost to West Point by one vote in Congress. Instead, local historians say that Pinckneyville was considered as the site for a federal arsenal. This was likely the source of the legend. In 1799, the General Assembly decided to restructure the state court system. Subsequently, the Pinckney District was abolished; with the loss of the court and associated businesses, Pinckneyville became a ghost town.

Antebellum period 
During the early 1800s settlers developed large-scale cotton growing in the fertile soil of southern Union County, based on the use of enslaved labor. The demand for slaves in the Deep South drove the domestic market, and more than one million slaves were forcibly transported to the South in the antebellum years. There were numerous plantations in the county, several that are still standing, such as Rose Hill Plantation and the Cross Keys House. Rose Hill was the home of South Carolina's "Secession Governor," William Henry Gist. The northern section of the county was mostly home to yeoman farmers and small scale planters who owned fewer slaves.

The county grew steadily during the antebellum period but remained almost fully agrarian. Stores and other businesses were established in the town of Union and a new courthouse and jail were designed for the town in 1823 by famed architect Robert Mills, designer of the Washington Monument. The courthouse was demolished in 1911, but the jail is still standing and in use by the City of Union. It is located beside the present courthouse, constructed in 1913.

Civil War and aftermath 
The Civil War brought a standstill to the county's growth and progress. Many local men rushed to enlist in the Confederate Army and numerous units of Union County soldiers served on battlefields across the South. On April 20, 1861, a strange object appeared in the sky above the Kelly-Kelton community of northeastern Union County. A large hot air balloon called the Enterprise descended to the ground, piloted by Professor T.S.C. Lowe, who had left Cincinnati, Ohio the day before. He had attempted to fly from Ohio to Washington, D.C. but instead was swept southward across Virginia into South Carolina. The locals crowded around this mysterious object, many insisting that Lowe be "shot on the spot," as they believed him to be a Northern spy. Local tradition states that Professor Lowe gave a Masonic distress sign and his life was saved by the Masons in the crowd. Eventually he would make it back to the North and work with the Union Army on aerial reconnaissance projects during the war. At the close of the war, Confederate President Jefferson Davis came through Union County following the fall of Richmond in 1865. He and his entourage crossed the ferry at Pinckneyville and made their way to the town of Union. They dined at the William Wallace house on Et Main Street in Union and the Cross Keys house in southwestern Union County before his eventual capture in Georgia.

Following the war, a system of sharecropping and tenant farming was established to take the place of slavery and provide a consistent labor force. Union County's history parallels the history of much of the South during Reconstruction. The county was known for widespread Ku Klux Klan violence during this time period. The Industrial Revolution hit the county in the 1890s as local businessmen and Northern industrialists began investing in Union County textile mills.

Cotton Mills and industrialization 
The first cotton mill was built at Lockhart around 1894; it was shortly followed by another in Union and Jonesville. Around 1900, a mill was built west of Union and the town of Buffalo sprang up around it. Workers, or operatives as they were called, lived in company-owned housing and obtained their food and other household goods from the company store. Many workers came from the mountains of North Carolina, where farming was difficult and outside work scarce.

In 1897, the Draytonville and Gowdeysville townships were removed from Union County to form part of Cherokee County.

The turn of the century saw continued progress, as improvements were made in the city of Union and throughout the county. Roads were being paved and the automobile was introduced as new businesses appeared along the Main Street area.

The Great Depression brought difficulties to the mill village, as pay decreased for workers. Meanwhile, in the county's rural areas, farmers suffered much less than those living in the city since they grew most of what they consumed. In the 1930s, the federal government bought large portions of poor quality land in southern Union County and established the Sumter National Forest. This land had been planted in cotton for many years and was overworked. Government programs like the CCC, PWA, and WPA put many Union County residents back to work, and government money helped improve the county's water and sewage plants and public roads. Many Union natives enlisted in the Second World War while developments continued in both urban and rural areas of the county. Cotton production and agricultural acreage was steadily declining and by 1944 Union County was 53 percent "forest land." The automobile had changed the lifestyle of mill workers because now they could drive to work and were no longer required to live in the proximity of the mill villages.

Modern times 
The post-war years saw the introduction of new industries to the county, such as Torrington and Sonoco. Despite this, the county's economy remained 94 percent textile-related in 1970. In 1955, the U.S. 176 bypass (Duncan Bypass) was constructed, along with other road improvements that followed in later years. The Bypass became the center for much of Union's new business, including shopping centers and restaurants. In 1984, work on a four-lane connector to Spartanburg began which would become the Furman Fendley Highway (U.S. 176).

Beginning in the 1980s, many of Union County's textile industries began closing and moving to other countries. The final departure of the textile industry was complete by the 1990s and this left a hole in the county's economy and cultural identity. In recent years, new specialty industries have taken the place of agriculture and textiles; two things that characterized the early history of Union County.

Geography

National protected area
 Sumter National Forest (part)

State and local protected areas 
 Rose Hill Plantation State Historic Site
 Thurmond Tract Wildlife Management Area

Major water bodies 
 Broad River
 Enoree River
 John D. Long Lake
 Pacolet River
 Tyger River

Adjacent counties
 Cherokee County – north
 York County – northeast
 Chester County – east
 Fairfield County – southeast
 Newberry County – south
 Laurens County – southwest
 Spartanburg County – northwest

Major highways

Demographics

2020 census

As of the 2020 United States census, there were 27,244 people, 11,432 households, and 7,701 families residing in the county.

2010 census
As of the 2010 United States Census, there were 28,961 people, 11,974 households, and 8,095 families residing in the county. The racial makeup of the county was 66.6% white, 31.3% black or African American, 0.3% Asian, 0.2% American Indian, 0.3% from other races, and 1.2% from two or more races. Those of Hispanic or Latino origin made up 1.0% of the population. In terms of ancestry, 13.4% were American, 8.4% were Irish, 6.2% were English, and 5.4% were German.

Of the 11,974 households, 31.5% had children under the age of 18 living with them, 43.0% were married couples living together, 19.1% had a female householder with no husband present, 32.4% were non-families, and 29.0% of all households were made up of individuals. The average household size was 2.38 and the average family size was 2.90. The median age was 41.9 years.

The median income for a household in the county was $33,470 and the median income for a family was $42,537. Males had a median income of $39,306 versus $26,767 for females. The per capita income for the county was $18,495. About 16.7% of families and 20.1% of the population were below the poverty line, including 27.2% of those under age 18 and 17.1% of those age 65 or over.

Government and politics
In 2020, Union County Sheriff David Taylor was charged with misconduct in office and disseminating obscene material, over lewd and obscene texts sent to a county resident.

Education
Students residing in the county are served by Union County Schools, which operates seven public schools that serve about 4500 students. There is one high school, three kindergarten through 5th grade schools, two kindergarten through 8th grade schools, and one 6th through 8th grade school.

For some time, the county had three high schools, Union High School, Jonesville High School, and Lockhart High School. As of a council ruling, the three high schools have been consolidated. Jonesville High School and Lockhart High School were closed, and the students were reassigned to Union High School, which has been renamed Union County High School.

Union County High School's Yellow Jackets Football team has seen great success in recent past. They won the 4A State Football Championship in 1990 and 1995, and won the 3A State Title in 1999, 2000, and 2002. They were also state runner-up in 2001. The Yellow Jackets were led to their three most recent championships by former head coach and current State Representative Mike Anthony. He retired following the 2004 season. He was succeeded by Tommy Bobo, former Union High School offensive coordinator who left following the 1999 season to become the head football coach at Wren High School. Bobo led the Jackets to the region championship and the state semi-finals in 2005. Bobo resigned in 2007 after the school board decided to consolidate the three high schools. He accepted a position as an assistant at Spartanburg's Dorman High School. Jonesville High School Coach David Lipsey was hired to replace Bobo and be the first coach of Union County High School.

Union County High School's Junior ROTC program is only one of three teams in the nation to ever go four years in a row to The George C. Marshall Leadership and Academic Bowl in Washington, DC. Members of that team included Michael Leigh, Tommy McKelvey, Micheal Stewart, Lucas Kelley, Ollie Burns, and Mitchell Ward.

The county is also home to a satellite campus of the University of South Carolina. The University of South Carolina campus at Union was opened in 1965 and was once home to the USCU Bantams, a junior college basketball team that saw some success at that level before the team was ended in the 1980s. Since 1965, USC-Union has provided low-cost, fully accredited courses that satisfy the degree requirements at the University of South Carolina and at other colleges and universities. The University of South Carolina at Union enrolls between 300 and 400 students each semester. In addition to associate degrees, USC-Union provides special opportunities such as teacher preparation and access to baccalaureate degrees in interdisciplinary studies.

Union county's Carnegie Library was named Best Small Library in America by Library Journal for 2009.

Communities

City
 Union (county seat and largest city)

Towns
 Carlisle
 Jonesville
 Lockhart

Census-designated places
 Buffalo
 Monarch Mill

Unincorporated communities
 Cross Keys
 Santuc
 Fish Dam
Bogansville
Goshen Hill
Jonesville *Pinckney

Notable people
 John Duff, (c. 1759 or 1760 – June 4, 1799 or 1805) was a counterfeiter, hunter, salt maker, judge, cattle thief, and Revolutionary War soldier.
 William Henry Gist, (1807-1874) was governor of South Carolina from 1858 to 1860
 States Rights Gist, (1831-1864) was a Confederate general in the U.S. Civil War.
 John William Pearson (1808 – 1864), businessman and Confederate soldier in the U.S. Civil War.
 Howard Franklin Jeter (born 1947), retired diplomat
 Susan Smith (born 1971), was a murderer who killed her two sons and falsely claimed that they were kidnapped by an African-American man. Her story gained national attention.

See also
 List of counties in South Carolina
 National Register of Historic Places listings in Union County, South Carolina
 South Carolina State Parks
 National Park Service

References

External links

 
 

 
1785 establishments in South Carolina
Populated places established in 1785